PEAQX is a competitive antagonist at the NMDA receptor. Although originally described as 100-fold selective for GluN1/GluN2A receptors vs. GluN1/GluN2B receptors, more detailed studies of the Ki of PEAQX revealed it only shows a 5 fold difference in affinity for GluN1/GluN2A vs. GluN1/GluN2B receptors. It is also a potent anticonvulsant in animal tests.

References 

NMDA receptor antagonists
Organobromides
Quinoxalines
Lactams